Unfold is the debut solo album by singer/songwriter Marié Digby. The album features the singles "Umbrella" (a cover of the Rihanna hit), "Say It Again" and "Stupid for You", and was released on April 8, 2008 in the United States via Hollywood Records. The album debuted at #29 on the Billboard 200 with 18,000 copies sold in its first week.

Album information
Digby started the recording process in early 2006. She worked with important producers, Dave Bassett (Idina Menzel), Mike Daly (Kid Rock), and Tom Rothrock (James Blunt).

Digby rode the internet video channel to a hit iTunes single, a Gap ad, and a song on Smallville. Digby's homemade videos feature her acoustic interpretations of hits by Rihanna, Linkin Park, and others - "Umbrella" being the most popular - and her debut includes more fully realized versions of those songs alongside Digby's originals.

Track listing
"Fool" (Bruner, Digby, Graham)– 4:09
"Better Off Alone" (Digby)– 3:54
"Say It Again" (Marie Digby, Jim Dyke, Marc Nelkin, Eric Sanicola)– 3:42
"Miss Invisible" (Digby)– 3:52
"Stupid for You" (Digby)– 3:22
"Girlfriend" (Bruner, Digby)– 3:39
"Traffic" (Cutler, Digby, Preven)– 4:01
"Voice on the Radio" (Digby)– 4:50
"Spell" (Bruner, Digby)– 4:37
"Beauty In Walking Away" (Bassett, Digby)– 3:40
"Unfold" (Digby)– 5:27
"Umbrella" (Shawn Carter, Terius Nash, Christopher Stewart, Kuk Harrell) – 3:48
Japanese Edition
"Say It Again"
"Better Off Alone"
"Traffic" (acoustic version)
"Girlfriend"
"Miss Invisible"
"Spell" (acoustic version)
"Stupid For You" (acoustic version)
"Voice On the Radio"
"Fool"
"Umbrella"
"Beauty In Walking Away"
"Better Off Alone" (acoustic version)
"Unfold"
"Umbrella" (acoustic version)
"Miss Invisible" (acoustic version)
"Unfold" (acoustic version)
"Kolewa" (Japanese hidden track) (Bruner, Digby)

Bonus Tracks:
Wal-Mart Edition
13. "Stupid For You (Acoustic)" (Digby) - 2:53 
14. "Better Off Alone (Acoustic)" (Digby) - 4:10

iTunes Edition
13. "Beauty In Walking Away (Acoustic)" (Bassett, Digby) – 3:27
14. "Paint Me In Your Sunshine" (Digby) – 4:02

Amazon Edition
13."Spell (Exclusive Acoustic track)" (Bruner, Digby) – 4:44

Asian Edition
13. "Stupid For You (Acoustic)" - 2:53
14. "Better Off Alone (Acoustic)" - 4:10
15. "Say It Again (Acoustic)" - 3:34
16. "Umbrella (Acoustic)" - 3:10

Chart performance

Release details

Personnel
Marié Digby – vocals, guitar, rhodes, synth, piano
Erina Digby, Sharon Celani, Gia Ciambotti – backing vocals
Peter Bradley Adams – keyboards
Dave Bassett – bass, guitar
Sasha Krivtsov - bass Sasha_Krivtsov
Matt Chait, Mike Daly, Lance Konnerth, Tom Rothrock, Mike Tarantino – guitar
Frank Coglitore – bass
John Nau - piano

Production

Producers: Dave Bassett, Mike Daly, Tom Rothrock
Mastering: Don C. Tyler
Engineers: Karl Egsieker, Mike Tarantino
A&R: Allison Hamamura

Photography: Emily Shur
Art Direction: Ryan Corey
Design: Ryan Corey

References

2008 debut albums
Hollywood Records albums
Marié Digby albums
Albums produced by Tom Rothrock
Avex Group albums